Quipolly is the site of a closed railway station on the Main North railway line in New South Wales, Australia. It is located about 8 km south of Werris Creek.

The station was open between 1879 and 1974, and no trace now remains. A passing loop exists at the site.

References

Towns in New South Wales
Main North railway line, New South Wales